Piatus may refer to:

Saint Piatus (d. 286), bishop of Tournai
Piatus of Mons (1815–1904), French theologian